The extreme points of Northern Cyprus are the most notable places that are closest to the most northerly, southerly, easterly and westerly areas of North Cyprus, the northern third of the Mediterranean island of Cyprus. The most easterly and northerly places are the same, due to the north-easterly protrusion of the Karpass Peninsula.

References 

Geography of Cyprus
Lists of landforms of Cyprus
Northern Cyprus-related lists
Northern Cyprus